Jay Andrijic (born 3 October 1995) is an Australian tennis player. Andrijic along with Bradley Mousley won the 2013 Australian Open – Boys' doubles title defeating Maximilian Marterer and Lucas Miedler 6–3, 7–6(7–3) .

Andrijic made the ATP top 1000 after reaching the semi finals of the Australian Futures (F10) in October 2013.

ATP Challenger and ITF Futures finals

Doubles: 4 (2–2)

Junior Grand Slam finals

Doubles: 1 (1–0)

References

External links
 
 
 

1995 births
Living people
Australian male tennis players
Tennis players from Sydney
Australian Open (tennis) junior champions
Grand Slam (tennis) champions in boys' doubles